Zachery Tyler Bryan (born October 9, 1981) is an American actor and film producer. He is best known for his role as Brad Taylor on the ABC sitcom Home Improvement. He also appeared in the films True Heart and The Fast and the Furious: Tokyo Drift.

Early life
Bryan was born in Aurora, Colorado, to Jenny and Dwight Bryan.

Career
Before he starred in Home Improvement, he appeared in local print and television advertising in Denver.  He then appeared at a showcase in New York City, directed by Peter Sklar, where he was seen by a professional talent representative. This, and his interest in acting soon brought him to California, where he was cast in the role of Brad, the oldest Taylor child, in the show Home Improvement. His character was known for experimenting with different hair styles as well as being the child most often in trouble. He is one month younger than Jonathan Taylor Thomas, who played his younger brother Randy on the show.

In the middle of Home Improvement Bryan made an appearance as Steve on The Fresh Prince of Bel-Air in 1995.
After Home Improvement ended, Bryan made brief appearances in many other television shows including (2002) Buffy the Vampire Slayer as Peter Nicols, (2005) Veronica Mars as Caz Truman, and (2006) Shark as Scott Natterson, as well as a guest appearance on an episode of Reading Rainbow.  Additionally, he made a cameo appearance on MTV's I Bet You Will in which he portrayed himself and competed in a challenge where he wrestled female convicted felons. In 2001, he portrayed an ice hockey player in an episode of Touched by an Angel. He also appeared on Smallville in 2003 where he played Eric Marsh, a high school baseball player using steroids made from meteor rock. He was the second Home Improvement alum to make a guest appearance on the show after Jonathan Taylor Thomas. In 2005, Bryan appeared as Bryan Nolan in ESPN's TV movie Code Breakers. Bryan also guest starred in Cold Case (as the young murderer in the flashback scenes) and in 2008 as a young man hiring a hitman to kill his stepmother on the show Burn Notice.

Bryan's film roles include the school bully in the 1996 Sinbad comedy First Kid. He starred in the 1995 movie Magic Island as Jack Carlisle, and the 1998 TV movie The Principal Takes A Holiday. He also starred as Eric in 1999's The Rage: Carrie 2. Later, he played defender Harry Keough alongside Gerard Butler in the 2005 movie The Game of Their Lives otherwise known as The Miracle Match about the 1950 US upset at the World Cup. In 2006, he played as a villain named Clay in The Fast and the Furious: Tokyo Drift, then in the 2009 TV mini-series Meteor, which aired on NBC. He also played Thor in the made-for-TV Syfy channel film Thor: Hammer of the Gods. The film originally aired on November 29, 2009.

In 2022, he was cast in The Guardians of Justice.

Personal life
Bryan's cousin is former NFL quarterback Brady Quinn.

In 2007, he married Carly Matros, whom he met while attending La Cañada High School. He is the father of twin girls (Taylor Simone Bryan and Gemma Rae Bryan) born in 2014, and Jordana Nicole Bryan, born in 2016. On March 18, 2019, Bryan announced the birth of their son, Pierce Alexander Bryan. Bryan and Matros called it quits in September 2020 after 14 years of marriage.

In October 2020, Bryan was held on several charges including felony strangulation, misdemeanor charges of fourth-degree assault and interfering with making a police report, after an apparent argument with his girlfriend in their apartment in Lane County, Oregon. In February 2021, Bryan pleaded guilty to two of the charges, while six others were dismissed. He was sentenced to three years of bench probation and ordered to partake in a batterer intervention program and to have no contact with the victim.

On November 17, 2021, Bryan announced his engagement to model Johnnie Faye.  Bryan and Faye welcomed daughter Kennedy Faye Bryan in April 2021. In early November 2022, Bryan and Faye announced they are expecting twins. They will be Bryan’s sixth and seventh children, and his second set of twins.

Filmography

Awards

Wins
 1994 – Young Artist Awards for Outstanding Youth Ensemble in a Television Series (Home Improvement) **Shared with Taran Noah Smith and Jonathan Taylor Thomas**
 1999 – Young Artist Awards for Best Performance in a TV Drama or Comedy Series – Leading Young Actor (Home Improvement)
 1999 – YoungStar Awards for Best Performance by a Young Actor in a Comedy TV Series (Home Improvement)

Nominations
 1993 – Young Artist Awards for Best Young Actor Starring in a Television Series (Home Improvement)
 1998 – YoungStar Awards for Best Performance by a Young Actor in a Miniseries/Made-for-TV Movie (Principal Takes a Holiday)

References

External links
 
 

1981 births
Living people
20th-century American male actors
21st-century American male actors
American male child actors
American male film actors
American male television actors
Male actors from Colorado
People from Aurora, Colorado